Chicago Peak is a  mountain summit located on the shared boundary of San Miguel County with Ouray County in southwest Colorado, United States. It is part of the Sneffels Range which is a subset of the San Juan Mountains, which in turn are part of the Rocky Mountains. Mining activity in the immediate area produced significant amounts of gold and silver.

Climate 
According to the Köppen climate classification system, Chicago Peak is located in an alpine subarctic climate zone with cold, snowy winters, and cool to warm summers. Due to its altitude, it receives precipitation all year, as snow in winter, and as thunderstorms in summer, with a dry period in late spring. Precipitation runoff from the west side of the mountain drains into tributaries of the San Miguel River, and from the east side into tributaries of the Uncompahgre River.

Gallery

See also

References

External links 

 Weather forecast: Chicago Peak

Mountains of Ouray County, Colorado
Mountains of San Miguel County, Colorado
San Juan Mountains (Colorado)
Mountains of Colorado
North American 4000 m summits
Uncompahgre National Forest